Ron Baker may refer to:

Ron Baker (American football) (born 1954), former NFL offensive lineman
Ron Baker (basketball) (born 1993), NBA basketball guard
Ronnie Baker (athlete) (born 1993), American track and field sprinter
Ronnie Baker (musician) (1947–1990), record producer, bassist, arranger and songwriter
Ron Bakir (born 1977), Lebanese-Australian entrepreneur